The year 1697 in music involved some significant events.

Events
Antonio Stradivari makes the Castelbarco cello.
Giuseppe Torelli arrives at the court of Ansbach.
Daniel Purcell and Jeremiah Clarke collaborate on the music for Elkanah Settle's play, World in the Moon.
The Opéra du Quai au Foin in Brussels closes for the last time.

Publications
Guilio Cesare Arresti – 18 Sonate da organo di varii autori (includes work by Pietro Ziani, Giovanni Bassani, Giovanni Colonna, Bernardo Pasquini, and others, as well as Arresti himself) 
Philipp Heinrich Erlebach – Harmonische Freude musicalischer Freunde
Aurelio Paolini – Suonate da camera a 3, Op. 1 (Venice: Giuseppe Sala)
Henry Purcell – Ten Sonata’s in Four Parts (trio sonatas), published posthumously in London (Nos. 1–4 composed c1678–79, Nos. 7–9 possibly in 1681–82, No. 10 possibly 1683–84)
Giovanni Maria Ruggieri – 10 Suonate da Chiesa, Op.4
Daniel Speer – Grund-richtiger Unterricht der Musicalischen Kunst

Classical music
Jeremiah Clarke – The Duke of Glocester's March
François Couperin – Laudate pueri
Henri Dumont – Motets de Mr. Dumont a 4 parties
Johann Krieger 
Sechs musicalische Partien
Uns ist ein Kind geboren
Carl Rosier – Sonata in C major, Kuckuckssonate
Johann Christoph Rothe – St Matthew Passion

Opera
Hendrik Anders – Min- en wijn-strijd
Antonio Caldara – La promessa sebata al primo
André Campra – L'Europe galante (opera-ballet)
Sebastiano Cherici – Ildegonda
Henri Desmarets – Venus et Adonis
André Cardinal Destouches – Issé
Louis de Lacoste – Aricie
Alessandro Scarlatti 
La Caduta del Decemviri
L'Emireno, R.345.32

Theoretical writings
Johan Georg Ahlens musikalisches Sommer-Gespräche by Johann Georg Ahle, on cadences, rhetorical figures, and modes. Second part of Ahle's Musikalische Gespräche series of treatises in form of dialogues.

Births
January 1 – Johann Pfeiffer, violinist and composer (died 1761)
January 30 – Johann Joachim Quantz, flautist and composer (died 1773)
April 16 – Johann Gottlieb Görner, organist and composer (died 1778)
April 26 – Adam Falckenhagen, lutenist and composer (died 1754)
May 10 – Jean-Marie Leclair, violinist and composer (died 1764)
June 11 – Francesco Antonio Vallotti, organist, music theorist and composer (died 1780)
November 9 – Claudio Casciolini, composer (died 1760)
December 5 – Giuseppe de Majo, organist and composer (died 1771)
December 6 – Carlo Arrigoni, composer (died 1744)

Deaths
January 4 – Amalia Catharina, Countess of Erbach, poet and composer (born 1640)
January 6 – Carlo Mannelli, violinist, castrato and composer (born 1640)
March 23 – William Child, organist and composer (born 1606)
March 29 – Nicolaus Bruhns, organist and composer (born 1665)
May 29 – Giovanni Francesco Grossi, singer (born 1653)

References

 
17th century in music
Music by year